The John H. Johnston Cotton Gin Historic District encompasses a historic cotton gin in the small community of Levesque, Arkansas.  The main building of the gin was built in 1941, and was built out of reinforced concrete, instead of the more usual steel, owing to a metal shortage in World War II.  It has some Moderne styling, with smooth surfaces and rounded corners.  The gin also distinctively incorporates a seed storage facility at its rear.  Its ancillary structures, which include a shed, privy, and cyclone structure, are wood-framed with metal siding and roofing.

The gin was listed on the National Register of Historic Places in 2005.

See also
National Register of Historic Places listings in Cross County, Arkansas

References

Streamline Moderne architecture in the United States
Buildings and structures completed in 1941
Buildings and structures in Cross County, Arkansas
Historic districts on the National Register of Historic Places in Arkansas
National Register of Historic Places in Cross County, Arkansas
Cotton gin
Cotton industry in the United States